Lauren Elizabeth Ash (born February 4, 1983) is a  Canadian actress and comedian based in Los Angeles, but originally from Belleville, Ontario. Ash is best known among television audiences for her role as Dina Fox on the sitcom Superstore. She is also an alumna of both Second City Toronto Mainstage and Second City Chicago mainstage and is one half of sketch comedy duo "Cory!" She is a two-time Canadian Comedy Award winner for Best Female Improviser in 2006 and 2007  and has also won for Best Performance by a Female - Television for Almost Heroes in 2012 and in 2015 won Best Female Performance in a Feature Film for her role as Carol in the movie Dirty Singles. She also appeared in the prank show "Scare Tactics". Since 2020, Lauren co-hosts her own podcast, "True Crime and Cocktails" along with her cousin, Christy Oxborrow.

Career 
Ash has played various roles in Scare Tactics as well as the Canadian TV series Almost Heroes where she won the Canadian Comedy Award for Best Female Improviser. She also won Best Comedic Play in 2008 and Best Sketch Troupe in 2006.

She had a recurring role in The Ron James Show and made guest appearances in Lost Girl, Cracked, Bomb Girls and Call Me Fitz. Other film and television credits include Video on Trial, Hotbox and the Academy Award-nominated film Lars and the Real Girl. She was also the voice of Sam Goldman in the animated Canadian series The Dating Guy. She was part of the American sitcom Super Fun Night alongside Rebel Wilson and Liza Lapira. She previously appeared in the first season Comedy Central series Another Period as Hortense, having taken over the role from Artemis Pebdani who played her in the pilot.

She won the Canadian Screen Award for Best Supporting Actress in a Comedy Series at the 3rd Canadian Screen Awards for her appearance on Spun Out.

Ash starred as Dina Fox from 2015-2021 on the NBC sitcom Superstore.

From 2018 to 2020, she voiced Scorpia in She-Ra and the Princesses of Power.

In 2020, she began a weekly podcast titled True Crime and Cocktails with her cousin Christy Oxborrow.

On April 13, 2021, Variety Magazine reported that Ash had inked an overall talent and development deal with NBCUniversal. She will also write a half-hour comedy pilot with Universal Television as part of her contract. She also starred in the Netflix animated comedy Chicago Party Aunt in the same year.

Filmography

Film

Television

References

External links

1983 births
21st-century Canadian actresses
Canadian film actresses
Canadian television actresses
Canadian voice actresses
Living people
People from Belleville, Ontario
Actresses from Ontario
Best Supporting Actress in a Comedy Series Canadian Screen Award winners
Canadian Comedy Award winners